Jonathan Seet (born November 23, 1969) is a Singaporean-born Canadian singer-songwriter, composer and producer.

Seet was born in Singapore to a Singaporean father and an Irish mother who emigrated to Canada shortly after he was born. He currently resides in Toronto, Ontario and has lived in Oxford and London, UK.

Biography

Early life
Seet began singing in the church choir at St. Peter's Anglican Church in Cobourg, Ontario at age 4 and started piano lessons at 5. At 13 years old, he played the carillon at St. Peter's for several years. When he was 15, he was recruited as the church organist and choir director at St. George's Church in Grafton and Trinity Anglican Church Colborne, Ontario for 3 years before leaving for university. During this period, he played viola in the Northumberland Symphony Orchestra and was the president of his high school band in Cobourg.

Seet briefly attended Trinity College School in Port Hope, Ontario but then transferred to Cobourg District Collegiate Institute East where his father was teaching. He was highly involved in musical productions and programs at both schools.

He was accepted to several universities for music performance and composition programs but chose to study Electrical Engineering at the University of Waterloo whereupon he taught himself guitar and began songwriting. Upon graduating, Seet continued writing and recording songs while still working in various aspects of technology and performing in other Toronto bands.

Music career
He recorded and released Melatonin independently in 2000 and Arousal Disasters on February 14, 2003 with Aporia Records/MapleNationwide. Thanks To Science, We've Got Love was produced in 2007 but was only made available on iTunes and other digital audio formats in early 2008. The End of the Beginning EP, released in 2009, was similarly only made available digitally. The material from "Thanks To Science, We've Got Love" was largely derived from compositions pitched for television and film with Offensive Tie Publishing in Boston. Most of the work on "The End of the Beginning" was written and recorded in Oxford.

Seet was one of the founders and organizers of Toronto's annual Jeff Buckley Tribute (2000–2003), and produces, records and performs for other artists and also composes music for film and television and advertising. His song, Precious Things, was used in the second episode of the Canadian television police drama, Flashpoint.

Style
His writing often employs arching melodies over top sometimes uncommonly used chords, voicing and song structure. His compositional style has changed over the course of his recordings but has maintained a signature production style.

Earlier work (Melatonin (album), Arousal Disasters) was centered around conventional rock and pop instrumentation. More recent recordings include marrying symphonic elements with electronic/synth and rock instruments, as well as occasionally more simple arrangements with guitar or ukulele guitar ("Precious Things"). Songs vary from melancholic to anthemic with many of them drawing upon art rock and pop references.

Discography

Releases
 Melatonin (2000, Independent)
 Arousal Disasters (2003, Aporia Records/MapleNationwide)
 Thanks To Science, We've Got Love (2008, Independent)
 Precious Things [Single] (2008, Independent)
 The End of the Beginning EP (2009, Independent)

Contributions
 Soundtrack to the Short Film The School (2003, Berkeley Films)
 Separate – Brilliantfish (2003, Independent)
 Famous Secrets – Rachel Smith (musician) (2007, Independent)
 I Want To Grow Old in China – Theme (2008, Smoke Signals Projects)
 Flashpoint – Episode 102 End Montage (2008, Pink Sky Entertainment/Avamar Entertainment)
 Hexagonal – Brilliantfish (2010, Independent)
 Last – Brilliantfish (2010, Independent)
 Stay – Brilliantfish (2010, Independent)
 Redux – Brilliantfish (2010, Independent)
 Stay – Brilliantfish (2012, Independent)
 Naked Splendor – Greenway Blvd (2013, Independent)
 brilliantfish has left the building – Brilliantfish (2013, Independent)
 everybody's fine – Brilliantfish (2014, Independent) as Jeanbon Ham

See also
 List of University of Waterloo people

External links
 
 
 A compilation of media accounts.

1969 births
Living people
Canadian expatriates in the United Kingdom
Canadian folk singer-songwriters
Canadian male singer-songwriters
Naturalized citizens of Canada
Singaporean emigrants to Canada
Singaporean people of Chinese descent
Singaporean people of Irish descent
University of Waterloo alumni